Notorious but Nice is a 1933 pre-Code American sound film drama directed by Richard Thorpe and starring Marian Marsh and Betty Compson. It was produced and distributed by B movie studio Chesterfield Motion Pictures.

The film survives, with a copy preserved by The Library of Congress.

Plot

Cast
 Marian Marsh as Jenny Jones  
 Betty Compson as Millie Sprague  
 Donald Dillaway as Richard Hamilton 
 Rochelle Hudson as Constance Martin 
 John St. Polis as John J. Martin  
 J. Carrol Naish as Joe Charney  
 Dewey Robinson as T.A. Tuffy Kraft  
 Henry Kolker as Defense Attorney Clark  
 Robert Ellis as Prosecuting Attorney  
 Robert Frazer as The Park Man  
 Wilfred Lucas as Judge  
 Michael Mark as Henchman Bill  
 Jane Keckley as Mrs. Kelly - Landlady  
 J. Frank Glendon as Clark's Associate  
 Clarence Geldart 
 Edward Peil Sr. as Doctor at Hospital  
 Nancy Cornelius as Nurse  
 Louise Beavers as Ophelia  
 Bess Flowers as Miss Price - Martin's Secretary

Bibliography
Pitts, Michael R. Poverty Row Studios, 1929–1940: An Illustrated History of 55 Independent Film Companies, with a Filmography for Each. McFarland & Company, 2005.

References

External links

Notorious but Nice free download from Internet Archive(sticking)
Notorious but Nice on YouTube

1933 films
Films directed by Richard Thorpe
1933 drama films
American drama films
American black-and-white films
1930s American films